Pronstorf is a municipality in the district of Segeberg, in Schleswig-Holstein, Germany.

Famous residents
 Major General Paul Emil von Lettow-Vorbeck, the commander of the Imperial German Army during the East African Campaign, was buried in Pronstorf upon his death in 1964.

References

Municipalities in Schleswig-Holstein
Segeberg